This is a list of rivers in Central African Republic. This list is arranged by drainage basin, with respective tributaries indented under each larger stream's name.

Gulf of Guinea
Sanaga River (Cameroon)
Lom River

Atlantic Ocean
Congo River (Democratic Republic of the Congo, Republic of the Congo)
Sangha River
Kadéï River
Boumbé I River
Boumbé II River
Mambéré River
Ubangi River
Lobaye River
Mpoko River
Ouaka River
Kotto River
Ndji River
Bongou River
Mbomou River
Mbari River
Gboyo River
Chinko River
Ouara River

Lake Chad
Chari River
Logone River
Pendé River
Mbéré River
Ouham River (Bahr Sarh)
Nana Barya River
Fala River
Bahr Aouk River (Aoukalé)
Bahr Kameur (Bahr Oulou)
Gounda River
Vakaga River
Ouandija River
Ouadi Tiwal
Yata River
Bangoran River
Bamingui River
Gribingui River

References

Prentice-Hall, Inc., American World Atlas 1985
United Nations 2011
 GEOnet Names Server

Central African Republic
Rivers